United States participated at the 2017 Summer Universiade, in Taipei, Taiwan.

Medal summary

Medal by sports

References

 United States Overview

External links
Universiade Taipei 2017

Nations at the 2017 Summer Universiade
2017 in American sports
2017